Kevin Langbehn Ingreso (born 10 February 1993) is a professional footballer who plays for Malaysian Super League club Sri Pahang. Born in Germany, he represents the Philippines national team.

Club career

Ceres–Negros
In December 2015, Ingreso signed a contract for United Football League club Ceres–Negros. He remained with the club when it joined the Philippines Football League in 2017.

Buriram United
On 19 June 2019, Ingreso signed for Thai League 1 club, Buriram United.

BG Pathum United
On 1 June 2021, he joined rival BG Pathum United.

Samut Prakan City (loan)
After featuring in just 10 league matches for BG Pathum United, Ingreso was loaned to Samut Prakan City for the rest of 2021/2022 season. However, his appearance in 11 outings for the club could not help the team to come out from the relegation zone. He returned to his parent club at the end of the season.

Sri Pahang FC
Ingreso joined Malaysia Super League side Sri Pahang on a six-month loan deal.

International career
Ingreso was called up for the national team's 2018 FIFA World Cup qualifier matches against Bahrain and Yemen scheduled on June 11 and 16 respectively. He was not subbed in at the Bahrain match but made his first international debut after being subbed in at the Yemen match replacing Iain Ramsay at the 90th minute.

Ingreso has a role in the Philippines' 2–1 win over Tajikistan on March 27, 2018 which led to the national qualifying for the 2019 AFC Asian Cup. While he committed a foul which led to Tajik player Akhtam Nazarov scoring a goal through a penalty kick, he also scored the equalizer in the match by hitting the ball with his head.

International Goals
Scores and results list the Philippines' goal tally first.

Personal life
Kevin Ingreso's father is Dennis Ingreso, who traces his roots to Manila, Philippines and his mother is German. On 20 August 2020, Kevin married Carla Regin Lopez Ingreso.

Honours

Club
BG Pathum United
 Thailand Champions Cup (1): 2021

References

External links
 

1993 births
Living people
Citizens of the Philippines through descent
German sportspeople of Filipino descent
Filipino footballers
Filipino expatriate footballers
Association football midfielders
Hamburger SV II players
VfR Neumünster players
Kevin Ingreso
Kevin Ingreso
Kevin Ingreso
Kevin Ingreso
Philippines international footballers
Ceres–Negros F.C. players
2019 AFC Asian Cup players
SV Drochtersen/Assel players